Triphenyl phosphite ozonide (TPPO) is a chemical compound with the formula PO3(C6H5O)3 that is used to generate singlet oxygen.

When TPPO is mixed with amines, the ozonide breaks down into singlet oxygen and leaves behind triphenyl phosphite. Pyridine is the only known amine that can effectively cause the break down of TPPO while not quenching any of the produced oxygen.

Synthesis 
Triphenyl phosphite ozonide is created by bubbling dry ozone through dichloromethane with triphenyl phosphite being added dropwise at -78 °C. If triphenyl phosphite is added in excess in the synthesis, TPPO can be reduced to triphenyl phosphite oxide, PO(C6H5O)3, and oxygen gas.

References 

Ozonides
Organophosphites
Phenol ethers